Tor Arne Bell Ljunggren (born 6 June 1962) is a Norwegian politician for the Labour Party.

He served as a deputy representative to the Parliament of Norway from Nordland during the term 2013–2017. In total he met during 127 days of parliamentary session. He hails from Bodø.

References

1962 births
Living people
Politicians from Bodø
Deputy members of the Storting
Labour Party (Norway) politicians
Nordland politicians
21st-century Norwegian politicians